Malgachinsula is a genus of snout moths described by Rolf-Ulrich Roesler in 1982.

Species
 Malgachinsula anosibeella Roesler, 1982
 Malgachinsula maisongrossalis (Viette, 1953)
 Malgachinsula tsarafidyella Roesler, 1982
 Malgachinsula viettei Roesler, 1982

References

Phycitinae